Tall Saman (also Romanized as Tall Sāmān) is a village in Dadin Rural District, Jereh and Baladeh District, Kazerun County, Fars Province, Iran. At the 2006 census, its population was 562, in 117 families.

References 

Populated places in Kazerun County